Georg Freiherr von Gayl (25 February 1850, Berlin – 3 May 1927) was a Prussian officer, and General during World War I. He was a recipient of Pour le Mérite.

Awards
 Iron Cross of 1870, 2nd class
 Order of the Red Eagle, 2nd class with Oak Leaves and Swords (1901)
 Pour le Mérite (8 May 1918)

References
 Hildebrand, Karl-Friedrich and Zweng, Christian (1999). Die Ritter des Ordens Pour le Mérite des I. Weltkriegs, Band 1: A-G. Osnabrück, Germany: Biblio Verlag. .

1850 births
1927 deaths
Military personnel from Berlin
People from the Province of Brandenburg
Barons of Germany
Generals of Infantry (Prussia)
Members of the Prussian House of Lords
German Army generals of World War I
Recipients of the Iron Cross (1870), 2nd class
Recipients of the Pour le Mérite (military class)